Claysville may refer to several places in the United States:

Claysville, Alabama, an unincorporated community in Marshall County
Claysville, Indiana, an unincorporated community in Washington County
Claysville, Harrison County, Kentucky, an unincorporated community
a former name for Clay, Kentucky, in Webster County
Claysville, Boone County, Missouri, an unincorporated community
Claysville, Clay County, Missouri, an unincorporated community
Claysville, Ohio, an unincorporated community
Claysville, Pennsylvania, a borough in Washington County
Claysville, West Virginia, an unincorporated community in Mineral County

See also 
 Clay (disambiguation)
 Claysburg (disambiguation)